One Way Out is a 2021 studio album by American rock musician Melissa Etheridge.

Recording and release
One Way Out is a 2013 recording of songs that Etheridge wrote in her early career, but felt like she couldn't release at the time. For this album, she reconnected with many of the musicians who backed her when she first started. These recordings were initially intended for a box set that ended up being canceled and were released as a stand-alone album instead, which the artist completed during her downtime in the COVID-19 pandemic to fulfill a request from her record label BMG Rights Management. To promote the release, she recorded a music video for "For the Last Time" and toured, performing these songs alongside hits from throughout her career.

Reception
In a brief review ahead of the album's release, Tracy E. Gilchrist of The Advocate called this album a "return to form" for Etheridge. One Way Out was nominated for a GLAAD Media Award, losing to Montero by Lil' Nas X at the 33rd award ceremony.

Track listing
All songs written by Melissa Etheridge
"One Way Out" – 4:04
"As Cool as You Try" – 3:37
"I’m No Angel Myself" – 4:39
"For the Last Time" – 3:17
"Save Myself" – 3:21
"That Would Be Me" – 2:31
"Wild Wild Wild" – 3:22
"You Have No Idea (live) – 3:48
"Life Goes On (live) – 4:38

Personnel
Melissa Etheridge – vocals, guitar, harmonica on studio tracks, production
Kenny Aronoff – drums on live tracks
Niko Bolas – mixing and co-production on studio tracks
Mark Browne – bass guitar on live tracks
David Cole – mixing and co-production on live tracks
Chris Gehringer – mastering
James Harrah – guitar on live tracks
Fritz Lewak – drums on studio tracks
Kevin McCormick – bass guitar on studio tracks
Darren Melchiorre – design
John Shanks – guitar on studio tracks

Charts
One Way Out spent one week on the German album charts at 30, for the week of August 10, 2021.

See also
List of 2021 albums

References

External links

Review from Rock and Blues Muse

2021 albums
Melissa Etheridge albums
BMG Rights Management albums